Rhopalotria is a genus of cycad weevils in the beetle family Belidae. There are about six described species in Rhopalotria.

Species
These six species belong to the genus Rhopalotria:
 Rhopalotria dimidiata Chevrolat, 1878
 Rhopalotria furfuracea O'Brien & Tang, 2015
 Rhopalotria mollis (Sharp, 1890)
 Rhopalotria slossonae (Schaeffer, 1905)
 Rhopalotria slossoni (Schaeffer, 1905)
 Rhopalotria vovidesi O'Brien & Tang, 2015

References

Further reading

External links

 

Belidae
Articles created by Qbugbot